Yair Nathan Minsky (born in 1962) is an Israeli-American mathematician whose research concerns three-dimensional topology, differential geometry, group theory and holomorphic dynamics. He is a professor at Yale University. He is known for having proved Thurston's ending lamination conjecture and as a student of curve complex geometry.

Biography

Minsky obtained his Ph.D. from Princeton University in 1989 under the supervision of William Paul Thurston, with the thesis Harmonic Maps and Hyperbolic Geometry.

His Ph.D. students include Jason Behrstock, Erica Klarreich, Hossein Namazi and Kasra Rafi.

Honors and awards
He received a Sloan Fellowship in 1995.

He was a speaker at the ICM (Madrid) 2006.

He was named to the 2021 class of fellows of the American Mathematical Society "for contributions to hyperbolic 3-manifolds, low-dimensional topology, geometric group theory and Teichmuller theory".

Selected invited talks
Coxeter lectures (Fields Institute) 2006
Mallat Lectures (Technion) 2008

Selected publications
with Howard Masur: "Geometry of the complex of curves I: Hyperbolicity", Inventiones mathematicae, 138 (1), 103–149.
with Howard Masur: "Geometry of the complex of curves II: Hierarchical structure", Geometric and Functional Analysis, 10 (4), 902–974.
"The classification of Kleinian surface groups, I: Models and bounds", Annals of Mathematics, 171 (2010), 1–107.
with Jeffrey Brock, and Richard Canary: "The classification of Kleinian surface groups, II: The ending lamination conjecture", Annals of Mathematics, 176 (2012), 1–149.
with Jason Behrstock: "Dimension and rank for mapping class groups", Annals of Mathematics (2) 167 (2008), no. 3, 1055–1077.
"The classification of punctured-torus groups", Annals of Mathematics, 149 (1999), 559–626.
"On rigidity, limit sets, and end invariants of hyperbolic 3-manifolds", Journal of the American Mathematical Society, 7 (3), 539–588.

See also
Ending lamination theorem
Curve complex

Quotes
 "When Thurston proposed it, the virtual Haken conjecture seemed like a small question, but it hung on stubbornly, shining a spotlight on how little we knew about the field."

References

External links
Minsky's home page at Yale University
Minsky's profile at Google Scholar

20th-century American mathematicians
1962 births
Princeton University alumni
Yale University faculty
Sloan Research Fellows
Topologists
Geometers
Living people
University of Michigan faculty
Fellows of the American Mathematical Society
21st-century American mathematicians